Pandemonium is the ninth studio album by English post-punk band Killing Joke, released on 2 August 1994 by Butterfly Records. The album marked Killing Joke's return after a four-year hiatus, the longest the band had taken since it was founded. It also featured the return of founding member Youth, who replaced Paul Raven on bass.

Content 

The vocal tracks for "Pandemonium", "Exorcism" and "Millennium" were recorded in the King's Chamber of The Great Pyramid of Giza. The session was filmed by director Shaun Pettigrew and features in the Killing Joke documentary The Death And Resurrection Show (2013) which also details alleged paranormal experiences during the recording.

Frontman Jaz Coleman considered Pandemonium to be a conceptual album on the external influence of Arabic music, which was spread throughout the album. It also incorporated his perspective on life, which is apparent in songs such as "Labyrinth" and "Pleasures of the Flesh".

A track called "Hallucinations of a Cynic" was also recorded, but left off the album.

The title track, as well as "Communion" and "Whiteout", would become live staples of the band.

Release 

Pandemonium was released on 2 August 1994 by Youth's record label Butterfly Records.

The singles "Millennium" and "Pandemonium" both reached the UK top 40 and the album is the band's best selling work.

It was reissued in remastered form in 2005, featuring two additional tracks: a remix of "Another Cult Goes Down" and an experimental dub remix of "Pandemonium".

Reception 

Pandemonium has been generally moderately-well received by critics.

Kerrang! magazine wrote, "Gargantuanly heavy, catchy and hilarious at turns, Pandemonium yokes pounding slabs of techno-metal to Coleman's cosmic visions, to exhilarating, trance-inducing effect". Trouser Press described it as "a significant upgrade from Extremities, Dirt and Various Repressed Emotions".

The Guardian described the album as a return to form for the band.

Track listing

Personnel 

 Killing Joke

 Jaz Coleman – vocals, synthesizer
 Kevin "Geordie" Walker – guitar
 Martin "Youth" Glover – bass guitar, production, mixing

 Additional personnel

 Geoff Dugmore – drums
 Tom Larkin – drums
 Larry De Zoete – drums
 Hossam Ramzy – percussion
 Said El Artist – percussion
 Aboud Abdel Al – violin
 Matt Austin – programming
Paddy Free – programming

 Technical

 Greg Hunter – production, engineering, mixing
 Ron Saint Germain – mixing
 Sameh Almazny – engineering assistance
 Natalie Heath – engineering assistance
 Matt Howe – engineering assistance
 Sheldon Isaac – engineering assistance
 Mike Coles - cover design

Charts

References

External links 

 

Killing Joke albums
1994 albums
Zoo Entertainment (record label) albums
Industrial rock albums